The 1992–93 NBA season was the Hawks' 44th season in the National Basketball Association, and 25th season in Atlanta. The Hawks had the tenth pick in the 1992 NBA draft, and selected Adam Keefe out of Stanford University. During the off-season, the team acquired Mookie Blaylock from the New Jersey Nets. Despite having Dominique Wilkins back after missing most of the previous year with a ruptured Achilles tendon, the Hawks lost five of their first seven games, but managed to defeat the defending champion Chicago Bulls on the road, 100–99 at the Chicago Stadium on November 7. As the season progressed, the team continued to struggle playing below 500. for the first half of the season, holding a 24–27 record at the All-Star break. However, after holding a 26–31 record as of March 4, the Hawks would win 12 of their next 13 games while posting a 12–3 record in March, on their way to finishing fourth in the Central Division with a 43–39 record.

Wilkins surpassed Bob Pettit as the Hawks all-time scoring leader, finishing second in the league in scoring averaging 29.9 points, plus contributing 6.8 rebounds per game. He was named to the All-NBA Second Team, was selected for the 1993 NBA All-Star Game, and finished in fifth place in Most Valuable Player voting. In addition, Kevin Willis averaged 17.9 points and 12.9 rebounds per game, while Blaylock provided the team with 13.4 points, 8.4 assists and 2.5 steals per game, second-year guard Stacey Augmon contributed 14.0 points per game, and Duane Ferrell provided with 10.2 points per game off the bench.

However, in the Eastern Conference First Round of the playoffs, the Hawks were swept by the Bulls in three straight games. The Bulls would go on to defeat the Phoenix Suns in six games in the NBA Finals, winning their third consecutive championship. This was Wilkins' final full season with the Hawks before being traded to the Los Angeles Clippers midway through the following season. Also, following the season, head coach Bob Weiss was fired, and Travis Mays was released to free agency.

For the season, the Hawks changed their uniforms, which remained in use until 1995.

Draft picks

Roster

Roster Notes
 Power forward Roy Hinson missed the entire season due to a knee injury, and never played for the Hawks.

Regular season

Season standings

y - clinched division title
x - clinched playoff spot

z - clinched division title
y - clinched division title
x - clinched playoff spot

Record vs. opponents

Game log

|- align="center" bgcolor=
|| || || || || ||
|-

|- align="center" bgcolor=
|| || || || || ||
|-

|- align="center" bgcolor=
|| || || || || ||
|-

|- align="center" bgcolor=
|| || || || || ||
|-

|- align="center" bgcolor=
|| || || || || ||
|-

|- align="center" bgcolor=
|| || || || || ||
|-

Playoffs

|- align="center" bgcolor="#ffcccc"
| 1
| April 30
| @ Chicago
| L 90–114
| Dominique Wilkins (24)
| three players tied (5)
| Mookie Blaylock (5)
| Chicago Stadium18,676
| 0–1
|- align="center" bgcolor="#ffcccc"
| 2
| May 2
| @ Chicago
| L 102–117
| Dominique Wilkins (37)
| Kevin Willis (13)
| Dominique Wilkins (5)
| Chicago Stadium18,676
| 0–2
|- align="center" bgcolor="#ffcccc"
| 3
| May 4
| Chicago
| L 88–98
| Dominique Wilkins (29)
| Jon Koncak (9)
| Mookie Blaylock (6)
| Omni Coliseum15,141
| 0–3
|-

Player statistics

Season

Playoffs

Player Statistics Citation:

Awards
 Dominique Wilkins, All-NBA Second Team

Transactions

References

See also
 1992–93 NBA season

Atlanta Hawks seasons
Atlanta Haw
Atlanta Haw
Atlanta Hawks